Peter Selzer (born 25 June 1946 in Torgau) is a former East German race walker.

Achievements

Sources
http://www.racewalking-naumburg.de/history.html

1946 births
Living people
East German male racewalkers
Athletes (track and field) at the 1968 Summer Olympics
Athletes (track and field) at the 1972 Summer Olympics
Olympic athletes of East Germany
European Athletics Championships medalists
People from Torgau
Sportspeople from Saxony